Golovinomyces is a genus of fungi in the family Erysiphaceae. It has 66 species. Many of the species cause powdery mildew. Golovinomyces was originally circumscribed in 1978 by Uwe Braun as a section of genus Erysiphe. It was promoted to distinct genus status in 1988.

Species
Golovinomyces adenophorae 
Golovinomyces ambrosiae 
Golovinomyces americanus 
Golovinomyces andinus 
Golovinomyces arabidis 
Golovinomyces artemisiae 
Golovinomyces asperifolii 
Golovinomyces asperifoliorum 
Golovinomyces asterum (Schwein.) 
Golovinomyces biocellatus 
Golovinomyces bolayi 
Golovinomyces brunneopunctatus 
Golovinomyces calceolariae 
Golovinomyces californicus 
Golovinomyces caulicola 
Golovinomyces chrysanthemi 
Golovinomyces cichoracearum 
Golovinomyces clematidis 
Golovinomyces cucurbitacearum 
Golovinomyces cynoglossi 
Golovinomyces depressus 
Golovinomyces echinopis 
Golovinomyces euphorbiicola 
Golovinomyces fischeri 
Golovinomyces franseriae 
Golovinomyces glandulariae 
Golovinomyces greeneanus 
Golovinomyces hydrophyllacearum 
Golovinomyces hyoscyami 
Golovinomyces immersus 
Golovinomyces inulae 
Golovinomyces laporteae 
Golovinomyces latisporus 
Golovinomyces longipes 
Golovinomyces lycopersici 
Golovinomyces macrocarpus 
Golovinomyces magnicellulatus 
Golovinomyces monardae 
Golovinomyces montagnei 
Golovinomyces neosalviae 
Golovinomyces ocimi 
Golovinomyces orontii 
Golovinomyces poonaensis 
Golovinomyces prenanthis 
Golovinomyces pseudosepultus 
Golovinomyces riedlianus 
Golovinomyces robustus 
Golovinomyces rogersonii 
Golovinomyces rubiae 
Golovinomyces salviae 
Golovinomyces senecionis 
Golovinomyces simplex 
Golovinomyces sonchicola 
Golovinomyces sordidus 
Golovinomyces spadiceus 
Golovinomyces sparsus 
Golovinomyces tabaci 
Golovinomyces valerianae 
Golovinomyces verbasci 
Golovinomyces verbenae 
Golovinomyces vincae

References

Erysiphales
Leotiomycetes genera
Taxa described in 1978